Asadabad (also Romanized as Asadābād; also known as Asadīābād) is a village in Rastupey Rural District, in the Central District of Savadkuh County, Mazandaran Province, Iran. At the 2006 census, its population was 33, in 8 families.

References 

Populated places in Savadkuh County